Scythris cornuella is a moth of the family Scythrididae. It was described by Bengt Å. Bengtsson in 1997. It is found in Morocco.

References

cornuella
Moths described in 1997